Archips magnificus is a species of moth of the family Tortricidae. It is found on Sabah in Malaysia.

References

Moths described in 1990
Archips
Moths of Asia